The 26th Canadian Parliament was in session from May 16, 1963, until September 8, 1965. The membership was set by the 1963 federal election on April 8, 1963, and it changed only somewhat due to resignations and by-elections until it was dissolved prior to the 1965 election. Most of the MPs were elected as the single member for their district. Two represented Queen's (PEI) and two represented Halifax.

It was controlled by a Liberal Party minority under Prime Minister Lester B. Pearson and the 19th Canadian Ministry.  The Official Opposition was the Progressive Conservative Party, led by John Diefenbaker.

The Speaker was Alan Macnaughton.  See also List of Canadian electoral districts 1952-1966 for a list of the ridings in this parliament.

There were three sessions of the 26th Parliament.

List of members

Following is a full list of members of the twenty-sixth Parliament listed first by province or territory, then by electoral district.

Electoral districts denoted by an asterisk (*) indicates that district was represented by two members.

Alberta

British Columbia

Manitoba

New Brunswick

Newfoundland

Northwest Territories

Nova Scotia

Ontario

Prince Edward Island

Quebec

Saskatchewan

Yukon

By-elections

References

Canadian parliaments
1963 establishments in Canada
1965 disestablishments in Canada
1963 in Canadian politics
1964 in Canadian politics
1965 in Canadian politics
Lester B. Pearson